The Great Divide is a historical novel by the Canadian writer Alan Sullivan, which was first published in 1935. It was a breakthrough work for Sullivan, and was very well received by critics. It depicts the construction of the Canadian Pacific Railway in the nineteenth century.

Film adaptation

In 1937 the novel was adapted into a British film The Great Barrier, directed by Milton Rosmer and Geoffrey Barkas at the Lime Grove Studios in London. A number of changes were made from the novel.

References

Bibliography
 McLeod, Gordon Duncan. Essentially Canadian: The Life and Fiction of Alan Sullivan, 1868-1947. Wilfrid Laurier University Press, 1982.

External links
 

1935 Canadian novels
Canadian historical novels
Novels set in Canada
Novels set in the 19th century
Canadian novels adapted into films
Novels set in the 1880s